The Quran is divided into Surahs (chapters) and further divided into Ayahs (verses). The real translation of the word Ayah is actually "Sign [of Allah]". For a preliminary discussion about the chronological order of chapters see page Surah. 

Each surah except the ninth (At-Tawba) is preceded by the phrase  ("In the name of Allah, the Most Gracious, the Most Merciful."). Twenty-nine surahs are preceded by Muqatta'at (lit. abbreviated or shortened), unique letter combinations whose meanings are unknown. The first surah in the Quran is Surah al-Fatiha.

Surahs of the Makkah period are more related to themes such as Resurrection, Judgment, and stories from Judaism and Christianity. Surahs of the Medina period focus more on laws for personal affairs, society, and the state.

Table of Surahs 

 Makkan surah
 Medinan surah
 Nöldeke Chronology

Notes

Citations

Read Full Quran and Its Surah Yaseen

References

External links
 Quran.com - The Noble Quran, one of the most massive compilations of translations of the Qur'an.
 Quran Explorer, listing different titles (and place of revelation) by different translators of the Quran.
 Al-Quran, open source multi-language Quran project

List
Chapters